Baijnath Temple Complex is a cluster of 18 Hindu temples which are situated in the town of Baijnath in Uttarakhand, India. These temples are renowned for possibly being one of the very few temples in the world where Parvati is depicted with her husband Shiva. Pilgrims arrive here on occasion of Shivratri and Makar Sankranti.

It is a cluster of 18 stone temples situated on the left bank of Gomati river. There are 102 stone images, some of which are under worship, while other have been reserved by the Archaeological Survey of India. The principle deities at Baijnath temple complex are the Vaidyanath (Shiva), Parvati, Nritya Ganapati, Karttikeya, Narsimha, Brahma, Mahishasurmardini, Sapta Nartikas, Surya, Garuda and Kubera.

Location & Architecture

It is located in the Bageshwar district at a distance of 22 km from Bageshwar and 16 km from Kausani. The temple is approached from the riverside by a flight of steps made of stones constructed by the orders of a Katyuri queen.

The main shrine in the complex is dedicated to Vaidyanath Shiva in the form of a lingam. The depiction of Parvati, made of grey chloride schist, is a marvel of art. Another sculptural element of note is a life-size image of Kal Bhairava in vilasasana seated outside the Vaidyanath Temple.

History
When the Katyuri kings shifted their capital from Joshimath to Kartikeyapura, a large number of followers of estoric shaiva sects like the Lakulisha, Nath (Kanphata), Jangam, Vairagi, Sanyasi also followed them. In order to rehabilitate them, The katyuris built a large complex of temples dedicated to Vaidyanath Shiva, the name later got corrupted to Baijnath.

Several inscriptions dating back to AD 1202 have been found in the Temple complex. The temples were restored and rebuilt during the reign of king Gyan Chand. The temple complex was plundered by the Rohillas in AD 1743-1744 which led to the destruction of the Shikhar of the main shrine.

References

Footnotes

Bibliography
 
 
 
 
 

Hindu temples in Uttarakhand
Bageshwar district
Shiva temples in Uttarakhand